Ape hand deformity is a deformity in humans who cannot move the thumb away from the rest of the hand. It is an inability to abduct the thumb. Abduction of the thumb refers to the specific capacity to orient the thumb perpendicularly to the ventral (palmar) surface of the hand. Opposition refers specifically the ability to "swing" the first metacarpal such that the tip of the thumb may touch the distal end of the 5th phalanx and if we put the hand on the table as the palm upward the thumb can not point to the sky.  The Ape Hand Deformity is caused by damage to the distal median nerve (also called a Median Claw lesion), and subsequent loss of opponens pollicis muscle function. The name "ape hand deformity" is misleading, as some apes do not have opposable thumbs.

It can occur with an injury of the median nerve either at the elbow or the wrist, impairing the thenar muscles and opponens pollicis muscle.

Ape hand deformity is one aspect of median nerve palsy, which is usually caused by deep injuries to the arm, forearm and wrist area.

Additional images

Ape hand caused by median and ulnar nerve lesions.

See also
 Recurrent branch of the median nerve
 Median nerve palsy

References

Human anatomy